In mathematics, particularly in combinatorial group theory, a normal form for a free group over a set of generators or for a free product of groups is a representation of an element by a simpler element, the element being either in the free group or free products of group. In case of free group these simpler elements are reduced words and in the case of free product of groups these are reduced sequences. The precise definitions of these are given below. As it turns out, for a free group and for the free product of groups, there exists a unique normal form i.e each element is representable by a simpler element and this representation is unique. This is the Normal Form Theorem for the free groups and for the free product of groups. The proof here of the Normal Form Theorem follows the idea of Artin and van der Waerden.

Normal Form for Free Groups
Let  be a free group with generating set .

Definition. A word  is called reduced if it contains no string of the form 

Definition.

Normal Form Theorem for Free Groups.

Proof. Let  be the set of reduced words. We shall show that each equivalence class of words contains exactly one reduced word. It is clear that each equivalence class contains a reduced word, since successive deletion of parts  from any word  must lead to a reduced word. If  then ; moreover  is reduced with  It follows that if  with  reduced, then .

Normal Form for Free Products

Definition. The identity element is represented by the empty set.

Definition. A normal form for a free product of groups is a representation or choice of a reduced sequence for each element in the free product.

Normal Form Theorem for Free Product of Groups. Then the following two equivalent statements hold.
(1) If , where  is a reduced sequence, then  in 
(2) Each element of  can be written uniquely as  where  is a reduced sequence.

Proof

Equivalence
The fact that the second statement implies the first is easy. Now suppose the first statement holds and let: 

This implies  

 

Hence by first statement left hand side cannot be reduced. This can happen only if  i.e.

Proof of (2)
Define  as follows: 

  

Similarly we define .

Therefore by universal property of free product we will get a unique map  such that 

References
 .

Combinatorial group theory